The Fort of São Tiago is located in the historical centre (Zona Velha) of Funchal, Madeira.

History 

Originally built to protect the coast from piracy during the 16th-17th century during the reign of Philip I of Portugal. The Fort has been used for many purposes including housing British troops during the Peninsular War, the military police and the Funchal Lancers Squad at different times. It also sheltered victims of the 1803 floods that occurred on the island.

On June 24, 1901 King Carlos I of Portugal and his wife (Amélie of Orléans) visited the Fort and had lunch in a tent set up within the fort. Improvements were made prior to his visit.

From 1992 to 2014 it was the contemporary Art Museum of Funchal (now Museu de Arte Contemporânea da Madeira in Estreito da Calheta).

References

Sao Tiago